Shafiuddin Ahmed Babu (born June 1, 1973, Dhaka) is a former Bangladeshi cricketer who played in eleven One Day Internationals from 1997 to 2000. He is now an umpire and stood in matches in Bangladesh's National Cricket League.

References

1973 births
Living people
Bangladesh One Day International cricketers
Bangladeshi cricketers
Bangladeshi cricket umpires
Chittagong Division cricketers
Cricketers at the 1998 Commonwealth Games
Cricketers at the 1999 Cricket World Cup
Commonwealth Games competitors for Bangladesh
Cricketers from Dhaka